Almost Paris is a 2016 American comedy-drama film directed by Domenica Cameron-Scorsese and starring Wally Marzano-Lesnevich, Michael Sorvino and Abigail Hawk.  It is Cameron-Scorsese's feature directorial debut.

Cast
Wally Marzano-Lesnevich
Susan Varon
Joanna P. Adler
Ryan McCarthy
Adam LeFevre
Abigail Hawk
Adrian Martinez
Michael Sorvino

Release
The film premiered at the Tribeca Film Festival on April 24, 2016.  Freestyle Digital Media acquired North American distribution rights to the film in November 2017.  The film was released in theaters and on digital platforms on January 9, 2018.

Reception
Alan Ng of Film Threat awarded the film two stars out of five.

References

External links
 
 

American comedy-drama films
2016 comedy-drama films
2010s English-language films
2010s American films